Brickellia orizabaensis is a Mexican species of flowering plants in the family Asteraceae. It is native to Mexico the states of Veracruz and Oaxaca.

The species is named for the City of Orizaba in Veracruz.

References

External links
Photo of herbarium specimen at Missouri Botanical Garden, isotype of Brickellia orizabaensis

orizabaensis
Flora of Mexico
Plants described in 1894